David Quesada (born March 30, 1971) is an American former soccer forward who played professionally in Costa Rica and the United States.  He also earned one cap with the U.S. national team.

Player

High school and college
Quesada attended La Cañada High School where he played on the boys' soccer team. As a senior, he won the CIF championship and was voted CIF MVP. First time in history La Cañada High School Soccer wins a CIF Championship. He was inducted into the school's Hall of Fame in 1995.  After graduating from high school in 1989, he entered San Diego State University where he played two seasons on the men’s soccer team.

Costa Rica
While spending the summer with family in Costa Rica after his sophomore season at San Diego, Quesada was offered a contract by L.D. Alajuelense.  He signed with the team in 1992.  In 1994, he moved to San Ramon and then Saprissa before returning to the U.S. in 1998.   In 1996, Saprissa loaned Quesada to Club Deportivo FAS of El Salvador for the league championship game.  Quesada scored the winning goal, then returned to Saprissa.

MLS
On March 24, 1988, the Los Angeles Galaxy of Major League Soccer signed Quesada as a discovery player.  He played only nine minutes for the Galaxy after entering a June 7, 1988 game against the New England Revolution in the 81st minute for Steve Jolley.  The Galaxy released him on June 17, 1988.

Amateur
In 2004, he played for the amateur Los Angeles Croatia in the West Coast Croatian Soccer Tournament.

National team
Quesada earned his one cap with the national team in a 2-1 loss to Costa Rica on May 28, 1995.  He came on for John Kerr in the 88th minute.  In August 1995, he played an unofficial national team game against Benfica in the Parmalat Cup.

Coach
He currently coaches youth soccer in Glendale, California and is an assistant soccer coach with Claremont McKenna College.

In addition to playing and coaching soccer, Quesada owns a Bed and Breakfast in Alajuela, Costa Rica.

References

External links
 Sams-Army.com profile
 

1971 births
Living people
Soccer players from California
American soccer players
United States men's international soccer players
L.D. Alajuelense footballers
A.D. Ramonense players
Deportivo Saprissa players
C.D. FAS footballers
LA Galaxy players
C.S. Herediano footballers
Liga FPD players
San Diego State Aztecs men's soccer players
American expatriate soccer players
Expatriate footballers in Costa Rica
Expatriate footballers in El Salvador
Major League Soccer players
American soccer coaches
Association football forwards